Émile Knepper (26 August 1892 – 24 September 1978) was a Luxembourgian gymnast who competed in the 1912 Summer Olympics. He was born in Bettembourg. In 1912 he was a member of the Luxembourgian team which finished fifth in the team, free system event.

References

External links
Émile Knepper's profile at Sports Reference.com

1892 births
1978 deaths
Luxembourgian male artistic gymnasts
Olympic gymnasts of Luxembourg
Gymnasts at the 1912 Summer Olympics